Avunu  is a 2012 Telugu-language horror thriller film written, produced and directed by Ravi Babu and presented by Suresh Productions. Malayalam actress Poorna plays the lead role in this film that has Harshvardhan Rane playing the male lead. Score is by Shekar Chandra and cinematography by N. Sudhakar Reddy. The film was made on a budget of  45 Lakhs. It is loosely based on the 1982 American supernatural horror film The Entity and was dubbed in Hindi as Aatma Ka Ghar.

Plot

Long time lovers Mohini (Poorna) and Harsha (Harshvardhan Rane) get married and move into a new community where Harsha had bought a house. Harsha's parents come to stay with them for a few days and also to make sure that the marriage is not consummated before a certain auspicious time. Unknown to the inhabitants of the house a voyeuristic spirit lived there and it takes a certain fascination for Mohini. Unknown to Mohini the spirit follows her around everywhere and finds pleasure in watching her change clothes and taking a shower.

Meanwhile, their neighbours have a son named Vicky who can see spirits and have conversations with them. On a couple of visits to Harsha's house, Vicky has a conversation with the spirit. The adults dismiss his ability to be the overly imaginative mind of a child at work.

When the auspicious day arrives, Harsha's parents leave. Mohini starts packing for the honeymoon in Paris and the randy spirit in a fit of lust attacks Mohini and tries to assault her sexually. Terrified at being attacked by an invisible entity Mohini runs out of her house and seeks sanctuary in the neighbour's house. A visiting relative of the neighbors, an elderly pious woman instills courage in Mohini and takes her back to her house. The spirit kills the old lady brutally. Harsha comes home to a terrified Mohini who wanted to leave the house right away. But circumstances force Mohini and Harsha to stay in the house one more night before they left the house forever. That night proves deadly for both of them. The spirit enters Harsha and tries to assault Mohini. Trying to defend herself, she injures Harsha. Then we see her narrating the story to the police while the spirit Raju (Ravi Babu) is still beside her. The movie ends with Raju still following Mohini in the hospital.

Cast 
 Shamna Kasim as Mohini
 Harshvardhan Rane as Harsha
 Ravi Babu as Captain Raju
 Jeeva as C.I. Janardhan
 Gayatri Bhargavi as Swapna
 Sudha as Swapna's mother-in-law
 Chalapathi Rao as Ranga
 Rajeshwari as Ranga's wife

Production

Most of the film was Shot at Outer Ring Road of Hyderabad & near Gandipet. Ravi Babu shot the film on a budget of approximately  45 Lakhs. The movie was then picked up by D Suresh Babu for approximately  3.50 Crores after he became convinced about the film's potential. Prasad V Potluri later became associated with the film by picking up a stake from D. Suresh Babu.

Filming

The Telugu and Tamil versions of Avunu were shot under 50 working days. But it was post-production that took a lot of time. We had to create many shots and things during post production stage and it took us 3 months. The computer graphics in this film are going to be realistic. PVP is planning to release Tamil version at a later point of time."

Reception

DNA India gave a review stating "What keeps Avunu intact is the fact that it encompasses and presents everything within two hours to the audience, who are hooked and wondering what's about to unfold. Unlike Ram Gopal Varma's films, which uses darkness, cinematographer Sudhakar Reddy captures the excitement in bright light. Sekhar Chandra substantiates the tense mood of the film with a fitting background score. Avunu is a thrilling experiment worth watching". Jeevi of idlebrain.com gave a review of rating 3/5 stating "Telugu film lovers are driven by drama and intensity in this genre. Ravi Babu is a kind of director who directs films within his sensibilities. Avunu is such a kind of thriller where the fear factor and drama aren’t Indianized. If you like film of horror/thriller genre, you may watch it for its sensibilities and different filmmaking techniques."

Mahesh S Koneru of 123telugu.com gave a review of rating 3.25/5 stating "Ravi Babu’s ‘Avunu’ is a well made movie that has great pace and is a good watch. He should be appreciated for coming up with such different and clever films. The director succeeds in stoking two very raw emotions in the movie – lust and fear. If you love horror flicks, you should not miss this one." NDTV gave a review stating "Filmmaker Ravi Babu always presents something new in his films and true to his earlier works, the director has tried to adopt a unique storyline for this horror film too. Overall, definitely worth a watch for all horror movie lovers."

Oneindia Entertainment gave a review of rating 3/5 stating "Though Avunu is a little boring at times, the maintenance of horror factor is good in the film. The commercial success of the film depends on how the audiences receive it." postnoon.com gave a review stating "Ravi Babu deserves a pat on his back for crafting one of the finest suspense thrillers in Telugu in recent times, but the film truly belongs to Poorna." The Hindu gave a review stating "It doesn’t come with a horror certification, so watch it whether you have a weak or strong heart." Rediif.com gave a review of rating 3/5 stating "Avunu is cinema one doesn't get to see often. It is well written and crafted even though it takes its inspiration from Hollywood movies. Ravi Babu scores with this film. If you like the supernatural horror genre, go watch Avunu."

Sequel
Main article:
avunu 2

See also
 Avunu 2

References

External links
 

2010s Telugu-language films
2012 films
2010s supernatural horror films
Indian supernatural horror films
Films about elephants
Films directed by Ravi Babu